Yangbajain (also spelled Yangbajing) is a town approximately  north-west of Lhasa, halfway to Damxung in the Tibet Autonomous Region of China. The town lies just south of the Nyainqêntanglha Mountains, in an upland lush green valley surrounded by the tents of nomads with grazing yak and sheep populating the hillside. It is the site Yangpachen Monastery, which was historically the seat of the Shamarpas of Karma Kagyü and the Yangbajing International Cosmic Ray Observatory.

Geothermal field

The area is famous for the Yangbajain Geothermal Field, which has been harnessed to produce electricity for the capital Lhasa. There is a  thermoelectric power plant on the edge of the Yangbajain field covering 20–30 square kilometers. The power plant was established in 1977, and was the first development of geothermal power not only in Tibet but in the whole of China.   

The highest temperature inside the drilling hole is 125.5°C.

Holy Medical Spring Resort 

The Holy Medical Spring Resort has both two indoor swimming pools and one outdoor swimming pool, all filled with hot springs water. Bathing is allowed at an elevation of 4200m AMSL, likely making it the highest swimming pool in the world.

Yangbajing International Cosmic Ray Observatory
The YBJ International Cosmic Ray Observatory (羊八井国际宇宙线观测站) is located in the Yangbajing valley of the Tibetan highland, a site chosen for its high elevation at 4300 meters above sea level.
Collaborating institutes includes the INFN (Istituto Nazionale di Fisica Nucleare) and various Chinese and Japanese universities.

The KOSMA 3-m submillimeter telescope has been relocated to a nearby site and renamed CCOSMA.

See also
 List of astronomical observatories

References

Populated places in Lhasa (prefecture-level city)
Astronomical observatories in China
Damxung County